Denges-Echandens railway station is a railway station in the municipality of Denges, in the Swiss canton of Vaud. It is located at the junction of the standard gauge Jura Foot and Lausanne–Geneva lines of Swiss Federal Railways, although no trains on the former stop here.

Services 
 the following services stop at Denges-Echandens:

References

External links 
 
 

Railway stations in the canton of Vaud
Swiss Federal Railways stations